Creetown Football Club are a football club based in Creetown in the Dumfries and Galloway area of Scotland. Formed in 1905 as Creetown Rifle Volunteers Football Club, they adopted their present name in 1920. They originally played their home matches at Barholm Park, which had been the ground of Barholm Rovers, who went out of existence in 1905. They now play their home matches at Castlecary Park, which despite being a fairly undeveloped ground, accommodates up to 2,000 spectators. 

For the 2009–10 season, Creetown played their home matches 12 miles away at Ballgreen Park in Kirkcowan, which was the home of the now defunct Tarff Rovers, while upgrading work took place at Castlecary Park to bring the facilities up to league standards.

They presently compete in the South of Scotland Football League. Creetown can only qualify for the Scottish Cup by winning the South of Scotland League. However, their best finish to date is second in the 2004–05 season 

Their strip (uniform) colours are yellow and black.

Honours
Southern Counties Challenge Cup: 1984–85
Cree Lodge Cup: 1936–37, 2003–04, 2004–05
Dumfries and Galloway cup: 1957,1960 and 1981.
Potts Cup: 1933–34, 1934–35, 1981–82
South League Cup: 2005–06
Haig Gordon Memorial Trophy: 2003–04
Tweedie Cup: 1934–35, 2002–03, 2003–04
Wigtownshire & District Cup: 1935–36
Wigtownshire Cup: 1934–35, 1935–36
Wigtownshire & Kirkcudbrightshire Cup: 1933–34, 1934–35, 1937–38

References

External links
Official Site

Football clubs in Scotland
Football clubs in Dumfries and Galloway
Association football clubs established in 1905
1905 establishments in Scotland
South of Scotland Football League teams